Mimilanie Laurel Marquez-Lawyer (born 16 July 1964), popularly known as Melanie Marquez, is a Filipino personality development coach, actress, film producer, author, celebrity endorser, former supermodel and beauty pageant titleholder who was crowned as Miss International 1979. She is the youngest winner of Miss International in history at the age of 15 when she competed in Miss International 1979.

Pageant career

Miss International 1979

Marquez won a local beauty pageant competition when she was 15 years old, and the 1979 Miss International Pageant. Subsequently, she evolved as a successful fashion and commercial model and was featured in the local and international magazine covers. As an international model, she toured Europe and the United States of America. As an actress, she has played parts in action and dramatic films, including the title role in her own bio-picture. Later, she has become a TV host, film producer, and celebrity endorser.

Life after Miss International
In 1985, Ms. Marquez became the Face of the 80s winner in New York, USA. And in 1986, was the First Runner-up in the Supermodel competition. In 2000, she was voted the "Most Beautiful Miss International Winner" and in 2005, was one of the 6 Finalists in Mrs. World pageant held in India. She has appeared in the Binibining Pilipinas World of BC 2004 and World of Canada 2004 pageants.

Marquez is a modeling and image-enhancement coach. She trained Ruffa Gutierrez (Miss World 1993 Second Princess); Charlene Gonzales (Miss Universe 1994 - Top 6 Finalist); and Miriam Quiambao (Miss Universe 1999 First Runner-up). She has been a judge, coach, commentator, or host in beauty pageants, modelling contests, and talent-search competitions. Recently, she opened a modelling school for training models, beauty pageant contestants, and actors.

Personal life
Marquez was born in Mabalacat, Pampanga. She is a convert to The Church of Jesus Christ of Latter-day Saints after her marriage to an American in Utah named Adam Lawyer, her fifth husband. Melanie was involved in her church's 50th foundation anniversary in the Philippines.

In 2006, Marquez graduated with a bachelor's degree in business administration from the International Academy of Management and Economics.

Marquez has six children: two of whom have special needs, one being the son of Filipino actor and politician Lito Lapid, and her daughter—a model—with businessman Frederick Dee, Michelle, who is the Miss World Philippines 2019.

Filmography

Film

Television

Awards

References

External links
Melanie Marquez's college graduation

1964 births
Living people
Actresses from Pampanga
Binibining Pilipinas winners
Converts to Mormonism
Filipino child actresses
Filipino female models
Filipino film actresses
Filipino Latter Day Saints
Filipino people of Indian descent
Filipino television actresses
Kapampangan people
Miss International 1979 delegates
Miss International winners
Participants in Philippine reality television series
People from Mabalacat